Tapelo Xoki (born Tapelo Nyongo; 10 April 1995) is a South African soccer player who plays as a defender for South African Premier Division side Orlando Pirates.

Early and personal life
He was born in Khayelitsha in Cape Town. He attended Thembelihle Senior Secondary School.

He changed his surname from Nyongo to Xoki in 2019.

Club career
He started playing for Cape Town Liverpool before joining the Old Mutual Academy in Cape Town in 2012. He joined AmaZulu in 2014, signing his first professional contract lasting until summer 2017. On June 13, 2022, the defender made a move to the Soweto Giants, Orlando Pirates.

References

1995 births
Living people
South African soccer players
People from the City of Cape Town
Association football defenders
AmaZulu F.C. players
Orlando Pirates F.C. players
South African Premier Division players
National First Division players